In differential geometry, a quaternion-Kähler manifold (or quaternionic Kähler manifold) is a Riemannian 4n-manifold whose Riemannian holonomy group is a subgroup of Sp(n)·Sp(1) for some . Here Sp(n) is the sub-group of  consisting of those orthogonal transformations that arise by left-multiplication by some quaternionic  matrix, while the group  of unit-length quaternions instead acts on quaternionic -space  by right scalar multiplication.

Although the above loose version of the definition includes hyperkähler manifolds, the standard convention of excluding these will be followed by also requiring that the scalar curvature be non-zero— as is automatically true if the holonomy group equals the entire group Sp(n)·Sp(1).

Early history 

Marcel Berger's 1955 paper on the classification of Riemannian holonomy groups first raised the issue of the existence of non-symmetric manifolds with holonomy Sp(n)·Sp(1). Although no examples of such manifolds were constructed until the 1980s, certain interesting results were proved in the mid-1960s in pioneering work by Edmond Bonan and Kraines who have independently proven that any such manifold admits a parallel 4-form .The long awaited analog of strong Lefschetz theorem was published  in 1982 :                                        
                       
                    

In the context of Berger's classification of Riemannian holonomies, quaternion-Kähler manifolds constitute the only class of irreducible, non-symmetric manifolds of special holonomy that are automatically Einstein, but not automatically Ricci-flat.

With this convention, quaternion-Kähler manifolds can thus be naturally divided into those for which the Ricci curvature is positive, and those for which it is instead negative.

Examples 
There are no known examples of compact quaternion-Kähler manifolds that are not locally symmetric. (Again, hyperkähler manifolds are excluded from the discussion by fiat.) On the other hand, there are many symmetric quaternion-Kähler manifolds; these were first classified by Joseph A. Wolf, 
and so are known as Wolf spaces. For any simple Lie group G, there is a unique Wolf space G/K obtained as a quotient of G by a subgroup , where 
 is the subgroup associated with the highest root of G, and K0 is its centralizer in G. The Wolf spaces with positive Ricci curvature are compact and simply connected.
For example, if 
, the corresponding Wolf space is the quaternionic projective space

A conjecture often attributed to LeBrun and Salamon (see below) asserts that all complete quaternion-Kähler manifolds of positive scalar curvature are symmetric. By contrast, however, constructions of Galicki-Lawson  and of LeBrun show that complete, non-locally-symmetric quaternion-Kähler manifolds of negative scalar curvature exist in great profusion. The Galicki-Lawson construction just cited also gives rise to vast numbers of compact non-locally-symmetric orbifold examples with positive Einstein constant, and many of these in turn give rise to compact, non-singular 3-Sasakian Einstein manifolds of dimension .

Twistor spaces 

Questions about quaternion-Kähler manifolds can be translated into the language of complex geometry using the methods of twistor theory; this fact is encapsulated in a theorem discovered independently by Salamon and Bérard-Bergery, and inspired by earlier work of Penrose. Then  contains an -bundle  consisting of all  that satisfy . Using this, the total space  can then be equipped with a tautological almost complex structure. 
Salamon (and, independently, Bérard-Bergery) proved that this almost complex structure is integrable, thereby making  into a complex manifold. 

When the Ricci curvature of M is positive, Z is a Fano manifold, and so, in particular, 
is a smooth projective algebraic complex variety. Moreover, it admits a Kähler–Einstein metric, and, more importantly, comes equipped with a holomorphic contact structure, corresponding to the horizontal spaces of the Riemannian connection on H. These facts were used by LeBrun and Salamon to prove that, up to isometry and rescaling, there are only finitely many positive-scalar-curvature compact quaternion-Kähler manifolds in any given dimension. This same paper also shows that any such manifold is actually a symmetric space unless its second homology is a finite group with non-trivial 2-torsion. Related techniques had also been used previously by Poon and Salamon to show that there are no non-symmetric examples at all in dimension 8. 

In the converse direction, a result of LeBrun shows that any Fano manifold that admits both a Kähler–Einstein metric and a holomorphic contact structure is actually the twistor space of a quaternion-Kähler manifold of positive scalar curvature, which is moreover unique up to isometries and rescalings.

References 

 

Manifolds
Structures on manifolds
Riemannian geometry